Pyaar Ka Punchnama 2 is a 2015 Indian Hindi-language romantic comedy film, it is a sequel to the 2011 film Pyaar Ka Punchnama. The sequel is directed by Luv Ranjan and produced by Viacom 18 Motion Pictures and Panorama Studios Production. The film stars Kartik Aaryan, Omkar Kapoor, Sunny Singh, Nushrat Bharucha, Ishita Raj Sharma and Sonnalli Seygall. The film was released on 16 October 2015.

Plot
Three bachelors Anshul "Gogo" Sharma, Siddharth "Sid" Gandotra aka Chauka and Tarun Thakur are flatmates and best friends. Gogo falls in love with Ruchika "Chiku" Khanna; Chauka instantly falls for Supriya Agarwal. Thakur begins dating Kusum Singh, and they develop an intimate relationship.
Chiku, Supriya and Kusum don't like each other.

Chiku is too close with her friend Sunny, as close as they live together and can even sleep in one bed. Supriya hasn't the guts to tell her family about and introduces Chauka as just another common friend to them which irks him. Her dad looks for a groom for her, and even asks Chauka to help him, which complicates matters. Kusum is too cautious about money: she insists everyone, despite of relationship with another, should only spends his own money. 

The three men become too tired to solve the issues in their own love stories, leading to their girlfriends willing to help solve those problems. Chiku drives Sunny out of her house; Supriya finally tells her father that she loves Siddharth and wants to marry him, but gets firmly rejected; Kusum also agrees not to care that much about money. Kusum reveals to Thakur that her pregnancy test reports are negative, but expresses herself as willing to start a family if Thakur supports her financially.

Despite the effort of the three boys and the three girls, the problems remain: after Chiku drives Sunny out of her house, Gogo accidentally hears her flatmates telling her that she should break up with Gogo and be in love with Sunny, as they all think she and Sunny are real in love; Supriya runs away from home and meets Siddharth and spends the night with him. Her father arrives there the next morning with police. He accuses Siddharth of taking Supriya away from her house against her will. Supriya, who always does not have the guts to oppose her father, supports her father's claim and testifies against Siddharth. It plays in Siddharth's favour however as he breaks up with Supriya, thereby saving his life from being ruined. Thakur resigns and starts his own website, encouraged by Kusum. However, Kusum refuses to financially support Thakur's plan even if it will benefit them both if it succeeds.

Finally, the three boys all give up their love for feeling desperate. Gogo breaks up with Chiku by keeping saying "I love you" and he says he learns from her that those three words are cheapest words. Siddharth breaks up with Supriya in police station right after she testifies against him. Thakur breaks up with Kusum and tells her she should return over 850,000 rupees that he spent on her, according to her life rules that she doesn't like taking favours from anyone.

The film ends by showing all three men single, happy and enjoying each others' company, at the phone with their mother.

Cast
 Kartik Aaryan  as Anshul 'Gogo' Sharma
 Omkar Kapoor as Tarun Thakur
 Sunny Singh as Siddharth 'Sid' Gandotra / Chauka
 Nushrat Bharucha as Ruchika 'Chiku' Khanna
 Ishita Raj Sharma as Kusum Singh
 Sonnalli Seygall as Supriya Randhawa
  Sharat Saxena as Mr. Randhawa, Supriya's father 
 Mona Ambegaonkar as Mrs. Randhawa, Supriya's mother
 Manvir Singh as Sunny
 Rumana Molla as Ruchi
 Karishma Sharma as Tina
 Prakhar Shukla as Chiku’s best friend
 Rajan as a Gift Delivery Man

Soundtrack

The music for Pyaar Ka Punchnama 2 has been composed by Shaarib-Toshi, Hitesh Sonik and Luv Ranjan. The music rights are acquired by Zee Music Company.

Reception
Some critics enjoyed the comedy.

Rajeev Masand of CNN-IBN gave the movie 3 stars describing the movie as "The film is funnier than the prequel." He notes that "It’s in the last act that the film throws away any pretence of humor and adopts an especially spiteful tone that’s reminiscent of the earlier film. Until this point the jokes were consistently funny and the stereotyping seldom mean-spirited." 

Hindustan Times praised the performance of the actors, stating "All the actors fit perfectly into their characters: The boys effortlessly depict what men often discuss during boys’ talk and the girls play dumb as and when the character demands." 

The Hindu review stated "Carrying forward the flavour of the original, it is a film that many men make in their minds!" 

The Economic Times review mentioned 
"Sure, the film may resonate with the masochistic sorts who like taking a whipping in love or even those who enjoy a few laughs no matter the joke, but the rest can easily skip this one."

Like the 2011 film's famous five minute long monologue where Kartik Aaryan's character vents about the frustrations with dating women, this movie delivered a seven minute long monologue.

Box office
The film grossed 5.50–5.75 crore on its opening day, beating the records of Piku, Katti Batti and Jazbaa. By the end of the first weekend, a total of  total had been collected. The film collected  by the end of its opening week.

See also
Pyaar Ka Punchnama

References

External links
 
 
 

2015 films
Films directed by Luv ranjan
2010s buddy comedy films
2015 romantic comedy-drama films
2010s Hindi-language films
Indian buddy comedy films
Indian romantic comedy-drama films
Indian sequel films
Viacom18 Studios films
2015 comedy films
2015 drama films